Misonidazole is a radiosensitizer that was investigated in clinical trials. It was used in these trials for radiation therapy to cause normally resistant hypoxic tumor cells to become sensitive to the treatment.

See also
 Etanidazole

References

Secondary alcohols
Ethers
Nitroimidazoles